The Botel gecko (Gekko kikuchii) is a species of gecko, a lizard in the family Gekkonidae. The species is endemic to  Orchid Island (also known as Botel Tobago Island) of Taiwan.

Etymology
The specific name, kikuchiii, is in honor of Yonetaro Kikuchi (1869–1921), who collected natural history specimens for the Taipei Museum.

Habitat
The preferred habitat of G. kikuchii is the coastal cliffs of the southern part of the island, flanked with shrubs and secondary forests. It can also penetrate into the forest habitat, but has low density there.

Reproduction
G. kikuchii is oviparous.

Conservation status
G. kikuchii is classified as "endangered" by the Taiwan Wildlife Conservation Act.

References

Further reading
Ōshima M (1912). "Description of a new gecko from Botel Tobago Island". Philippine Journal of Science, Section D, General Biology, Ethnology and Anthropology 7: 241-242 + Plates I-II. (Gecko kikuchii, new species).

kikuchii
Reptiles described in 1912
Reptiles of Taiwan
Endemic fauna of Taiwan